Brachylia nussi is a moth in the family Cossidae. It was described by Yakovlev in 2011. It is found in Malawi.

References

Natural History Museum Lepidoptera generic names catalog

Endemic fauna of Malawi
Cossinae
Moths described in 2011
Moths of Africa